The American Lakes to Locks Passage and the corresponding Canadian  is a scenic byway in northeastern New York in the United States and in southern Quebec in Canada. The byway unifies the interconnected waterway of the upper Hudson River, Champlain Canal, Lake George, and Lake Champlain; this waterway is the core of North America's first "super-highway" between upstate New York and the Canadian province of Quebec. The initiatives of the Lakes to Locks Passage aim to unify the byway corridor as a single destination. The US portion of the passage is a New York State Scenic Byway, a National Scenic Byway, and an All-American Road. The Canadian portion is a tourist route by the Quebec Ministry of Tourism.

Route description
The byway extends from just north of Albany to the vicinity of the Canada–US border at Rouses Point as a highway and as a waterway. The waterway route continues north into Canada to connect with the St. Lawrence River.

The distinctive influence of French, English and Dutch settlers is still evident today in the communities along the rivers, waterfalls and lakeshore harbors. A series of 32 Waypoint Communities have been designated to "meet and greet" the Lakes to Locks Passage visitor. Community museums and attractions serve as Lakes to Locks Passage Heritage Centers. Nearly every community has a driving, biking or walking tour.

Highway

 US 4 from Waterford (mi. 14.33) to Whitehall (mi. 73.19)
 NY 22 from Whitehall (mi. 218.2) to Keeseville (mi. 298.82)
 US 9 from Keeseville (mi. 288.79) to Chazy (mi. 320.08)
 NY 9B from Chazy (mi. 0.0) to Rouses Point (mi. 5.7)
The route also contains lakeside roads both on Point Au Roche and Cumberland Head, featured as "Scenic Byways."

From Lacolle the  continues north to the village of Lacolle, then turns east along Route 202. It then branches along both banks of the Richelieu river until reaching its mouth in Sorel-Tracy.

 The western branch follows the west bank of the Richelieu north through Saint-Jean-sur-Richelieu, Carignan, Chambly, Saint-Basile-le-Grand, McMasterville, Beloeil, Saint-Marc-sur-Richelieu, Saint-Antoine-sur-Richelieu, Saint-Roch-de-Richelieu and the Tracy part of Sorel-Tracy. This branch mostly follows Route 223, with deviations through the historical centres of Vieux-Saint-Jean and Chambly.
 The eastern branch crosses the Jean-Jacques-Bertrand Bridge then follows Routes 225 and 133 through Henryville, Sainte-Anne-de-Sabrevois, Saint-Jean-sur-Richelieu, the town of Richelieu, Saint-Mathias-sur-Richelieu, Otterburn Park, Mont-Saint-Hilaire, Saint-Charles-sur-Richelieu, Saint-Denis-sur-Richelieu, Saint-Ours and Sainte-Victoire-de-Sorel.

Bridges crossing the Richelieu in Saint-Jean-sur-Richelieu, between Chambly and Richelieu, and between Beloeil and Mont-Saint-Hilaire, allow tourists to drive between branches.

Both branches meet again at the northern terminus, at the Sorel‑Tracy Heritage Interpretation Centre on the bank of the Saint Lawrence River.

Waterway
This waterway was North America's first inter-connected waterway that shaped the nation-building activities of the United States and Canada.
 Champlain Canal from Cohoes to Whitehall. The canal has 11 locks, numbered 1 to 12 (there is no lock 10).
 Lake Champlain and Richelieu River from Whitehall, New York, to Saint-Jean-sur-Richelieu, Quebec
 Chambly Canal, bypassing rapids on the Richelieu River from Saint-Jean-sur-Richelieu to Chambly, with 9 locks
 Richelieu River from Chambly to Sorel-Tracy

Notable attractions

Quebec along 

 Fort Chambly, Chambly
 Honoré Mercier museum, Sainte-Anne-de-Sabrevois
 Fort Lennox, Saint-Paul-de-l'île-aux-noix
 Chambly Canal between Chambly and Saint-Jean-sur-Richelieu
 Maison des Gouverneurs, Sorel-Tracy
 Gault Nature Reserve, on Mont Saint-Hilaire

New York State along Lakes to Locks Passage

 Fort Ticonderoga
 North Star Underground Railroad Museum
 Ausable Chasm

History
In 1992 the State of New York designated the Champlain Trail as a New York State Scenic Byway, recognizing the roadway's access to the scenic, historic, cultural, natural and recreational qualities of Lake Champlain and the communities that line its shores. In January 2000, the New York communities in Clinton, Essex and Washington counties that surround Lake Champlain completed a Corridor Management Plan (CMP) for the Champlain Trail as part of a plan for Lake Champlain Byways, a partnership with communities in the State of Vermont.  Also in early 2000, communities along the Champlain Canal in New York completed a CMP for the Champlain Canal Byway. In May 2000, the New York State Scenic Byways Advisory Board (NYSSBAB) recognized the strong grass-roots planning process and adopted the two plans.  In that the NYSSBAB provides statewide coordination of the NYS Byway program, they passed a resolution to recommend the merger of the Champlain Canal Byway and the Champlain Trail to form one management organization for a single Byway.

The Lakes to Locks Passage was recognized as an All-American Road by the United States Department of Transportation in 2002 for the byway's historic and recreational assets. As an All-American Road, Lakes to Locks Passage is one of a select group of roadways in the country that the Federal Highway Administration promotes as a "premier destination" in their marketing efforts for national and international tourism.

The byway is managed by Lakes to Locks Passage, Inc. a non-profit organization dedicated to building the appreciation, recognition, stewardship and revitalization of the natural, cultural, recreational and historic assets of the communities along the interconnected waterway of the upper Hudson River, Champlain Canal, Lake George, and Lake Champlain.

At the 2005 Quebec-New York Economic Summit, Lakes to Locks Passage Inc. and the Regional Conference of Elected Officers (CRÉ) of the Montérégie-Est region sign a memorandum of understanding to "jointly promote the region and to develop suggested routes for travelers to follow in the Quebec-New York Corridor region."

On the Quebec side, a project for a tourist route along the Richelieu had been discussed since the mid-1990s. The  was announced by the CRÉ in March 2010, after getting approval from the Quebec Ministry of Tourism for the touristic route in 2009. The CRE and Tourisme Montérégie officially inaugurated the route in July 2012.

See also

 Lake Champlain Seaway, a proposed large canal that would have traveled the route of the passage

References

External links
 Lakes to Locks U.S.-Canadian official website
 Lakes to Locks Passage U.S. Scenic Byway official website
 La Route du Richelieu official website

All-American Roads
Canals in New York (state)
U.S. Route 4
Canals in Quebec
U.S. Route 9
Roads in Montérégie